Edward Aldwell (January 30, 1938 in Portland, Oregon – May 28, 2006 in Valhalla, New York) was an American pianist, music theorist and pedagogue.

He was particularly renowned for his Bach interpretations, and he recorded several albums, most notably the complete Well-Tempered Clavier of Bach for Nonesuch, and Bach's French Suites for Hanssler Classics. He taught at The Curtis Institute of Music in Philadelphia and at the Mannes College of Music in New York City.

As a theorist, he was an expert in Schenkerian analysis, and he was the co-author (with Carl Schachter) of one of the standard theory textbooks used throughout the United States, Harmony and Voice Leading (first published in 1979). While driving an all-terrain vehicle, on May 7, 2006, near his country home in Kerhonkson, New York, he suffered serious injuries when it overturned. He died from those injuries in Valhalla, New York, three weeks later.

References

External links
 The Edward Aldwell Center in Jerusalem

1938 births
2006 deaths
American music theorists
Musicians from Portland, Oregon
Musicians from Rochester, New York
Road incident deaths in New York (state)
People from Valhalla, New York
20th-century American pianists
20th-century American musicologists
American male pianists
20th-century American male musicians